The Asian section of the 2018 FIFA World Cup qualification acted as qualifiers for the 2018 FIFA World Cup, held in Russia, for national teams which were members of the Asian Football Confederation (AFC). 4.5 slots (four direct slots and one inter-confederation play-off slot) in the final tournament were available for AFC teams.

On 16 April 2014, the AFC Executive Committee approved a proposal to merge the preliminary qualification rounds of the FIFA World Cup and the AFC Asian Cup, which expanded to 24 teams starting in 2019. Therefore, the first two rounds of the FIFA World Cup qualifiers also acted as qualifiers for the 2019 AFC Asian Cup in the United Arab Emirates.

Format
The qualification structure was as follows:
First round: 12 teams (ranked 35–46) played home-and-away over two legs. The six winners advanced to the second round.
Second round: 40 teams (ranked 1–34 and six first round winners) were divided into eight groups of five teams to play home-and-away round-robin matches. The eight group winners and the four best group runners-up advanced to the third round of FIFA World Cup qualification.
Third round: 12 teams (an increase from ten for 2014) which had advanced from the second round were divided into two groups of six teams to play home-and-away round-robin matches. The top two teams of each group qualified for the 2018 FIFA World Cup, and the two third-placed teams advanced to the fourth round.
Fourth round: Two third-placed teams of each group from the third round played home-and-away over two legs. The winners advanced to the inter-confederation play-offs.

Entrants
The 46 FIFA-affiliated nations from the AFC entered qualification. In order to determine which nations would compete in the first round and which nations would receive a bye through to the second round, the FIFA World Rankings of January 2015 were used (shown in parentheses), as those were the latest published rankings prior to the first round draw. The FIFA Rankings of January 2015 were also used for seeding of the first round draw; however, for seeding in the second round and third round draws, the most recent FIFA Rankings prior to those draws were used.

First ever participation of Bhutan. Recorded for the qualifications of 2010, this selection withdrew without playing a game (initial draw preview first round against Kuwait)

Schedule
The schedule of the competition was as follows.

First round 

The draw for the first round was held on 10 February 2015, 15:30 MST (UTC+8), at the AFC House in Kuala Lumpur, Malaysia.

Second round 

The draw for the second round was held on 14 April 2015, at 17:00 MST (UTC+8), at the JW Marriott Hotel in Kuala Lumpur, Malaysia.

Summary

Groups

Group A

Group B

Group C

Group D

Group E

Group F
Indonesia was also drawn into this group, but on 30 May 2015 the country's football association was suspended due to governmental interference, and on 3 June 2015 the team was disqualified and all matches involving it were cancelled.

Group G

Group H

Ranking of runner-up teams
To determine the four best runner-up teams, the following criteria were used:
 Points (3 points for a win, 1 point for a draw, 0 points for a loss)
 Goal difference
 Goals scored
 Fair play points
 Drawing of lots

As a result of Indonesia being disqualified due to FIFA suspension, Group F contained only four teams compared to five teams in all other groups. Therefore, the results against the fifth-placed team were not counted when determining the ranking of the runner-up teams.

Third round

The third round consisted of two groups of six teams. The first two teams in each group qualified for the 2018 FIFA World Cup. The two third-placed teams proceeded to the fourth round.

The draw for the third round was held on 12 April 2016, at 16:30 MST (UTC+8), at the Mandarin Oriental Hotel in Kuala Lumpur, Malaysia.

Groups

Group A

Group B

Fourth round

The two third-placed teams in each group from the third round played against each other home-and-away over two legs to determine which team advanced to the inter-confederation play-offs.

The order of legs was announced during the draw for the third round. Syria played their home match, as with all their home matches in the third round, in Malaysia due to the war time condition in Syria.

Inter-confederation play-offs

The draw for the inter-confederation play-offs was held as part of the 2018 FIFA World Cup Preliminary Draw on 25 July 2015, starting 18:00 MSK (UTC+3), at the Konstantinovsky Palace in Strelna, Saint Petersburg. The fifth-placed team from AFC was drawn against the fourth-placed team from CONCACAF, with the AFC team hosting the second leg.

Qualified teams
The following five teams from AFC qualified for the final tournament.

1 Italic indicates hosts for that year.
2 Australia qualified as a member of the OFC in 1974 and 2006 (qualifying took place until 2005 and they left the OFC and joined the AFC in 2006).

Top goalscorers
There were 668 goals scored in 225 matches (including 2 international play-offs), for an average of 2.97 goals per match.
16 goals

 Mohammad Al-Sahlawi
 Ahmed Khalil

11 goals

 Tim Cahill
 Sardar Azmoun

10 goals

 Omar Kharbin

9 goals

 Hassan Al-Haydos
 Ali Mabkhout

8 goals

 Yang Xu
 Mehdi Taremi

7 goals

 Mile Jedinak
 Yu Dabao
 Keisuke Honda
 Son Heung-min

6 goals

 Tom Rogic
 Mohannad Abdul-Raheem
 Shinji Kagawa
 Hamza Al-Dardour
 Taisir Al-Jassim
 Mahmoud Al-Mawas
 Manuchekhr Dzhalilov

For full lists of goalscorers, see sections in each round:

First round
Second round
Third round
Fourth round

Notes

See also
2019 AFC Asian Cup qualification

References

External links

Qualifiers – Asia, FIFA.com
FIFA World Cup, the-AFC.com
Preliminary Joint Qualification 2018, stats.the-AFC.com
FIFA World Cup 2018, stats.the-AFC.com

 
Afc
FIFA World Cup qualification (AFC)
2015 in Asian football
2016 in Asian football
2017 in Asian football